Getulina is a municipality in the state of São Paulo in Brazil. The population is 11,447 (2020 est.) in an area of 678 km². The elevation is 487 m.

See also
São Paulo

References

Municipalities in São Paulo (state)